Alexander Furman is a mathematician who is a professor at the University of Illinois at Chicago. From 1983 to 1986 Furman received his bachelor’s in mathematics and computer science at the Hebrew University of Jerusalem, where he later earned his master’s (1987-1989) and PhD (1991-1996) in mathematics.

Career 
Furman started teaching mathematics in 1996 as an L. E. Dickson instructor of mathematics at the University of Chicago. A year later, in 1997, he got a position as a Post-Doctoral fellow at Penn State University.  He has worked at the University of Illinois Chicago since 1997, serving as an assistant professor until 2007 and being upgraded to full professor.

Alexander Furman also runs the UIC Math Olympiad Project where he works with high school-age students, encouraging them to discuss and work out mathematical problems.

Honors and awards 
Furman's work in the field of mathematics has earned him a total of fourteen awards. In 1998, he won the National Science Foundation grant, which he would go on to receive four more times. He was also awarded a grant by the Binational Science Foundation three times in his career. In 2014 the Simons Foundation made him a Fellow in mathematics and the National Science Foundation Career Award for exceptional work in teaching through research. In 2014 he was an invited speaker for the International Congress of Mathematics hosted in Seoul. For his work in dynamical systems, ergodic theory, and Lie groups, he was one of the 50 individuals from across the world chosen for their contributions in mathematics to be an American Mathematical Society Fellow in 2016. His most recently received awards are the UIC's University Scholar Award and the LAS Distinguished Professor Award.

References 

Israeli mathematicians
Year of birth missing (living people)
Living people
University of Illinois Chicago faculty
Hebrew University of Jerusalem School of Computer Science & Engineering alumni
Einstein Institute of Mathematics alumni